New Market Airport  is a privately owned public-use airport located two nautical miles (3.7 km) west of the central business district of New Market, a town in Shenandoah County, Virginia, United States. The facility serves primarily general aviation for the areas around New Market.  The facility is also the base for a skydiving operation—Skydive Shenandoah—and arriving aircraft should be sure to check if skydiving operations are in progress on Unicom frequency 122.80.  Skydiving Operations are intensive on weekends throughout the year.

Facilities and aircraft 
It has one runway designated 6/24 with an asphalt surface measuring 2,920 by 60 feet (890 x 18 m).

For the 12-month period ending April 30, 2009, the airport had 15,413 aircraft operations, an average of 42 per day: 99.3% general aviation and  0.7% military. At that time there were 27 aircraft based at this airport: 93% single-engine and 7% multi-engine.

See also
 Shenandoah Valley Academy

References

External links 
 Aerial image as of 17 March 1989 from USGS The National Map

News report on April 10, 2017 plane crash by WHSV

Airports in Virginia
Transportation in Shenandoah County, Virginia
Buildings and structures in Shenandoah County, Virginia